This article lists the presidents of the Parliament of the Canary Islands, the regional legislature of the Canary Islands.

Presidents

References

Presidents of the Parliament
Canary Islands